The Florida naked-tailed rat (Solomys salamonis) is a poorly known and possible extinct species of rodent in the family Muridae. It was confined to the Nggela Islands (previously known as Florida Islands) in the Solomon Islands. The originally mentioned type locality Ugi Island is an erratum.

Description
The Florida naked-tailed rat is the smallest species within the genus Solomys. It has a snout-vent-length of 187 mm. The tail length is 194 mm, the hind food length is 39 mm and the ear length 27 mm. The general colour of the fur is light ashy grey, somewhat grizzly, and pencilled with black. The base of the hair is mouse colour. The tips are almost white. The tail is bare and scaly. The blackish whiskers are long. The ears are small, inside grey, on the outside covered with minute hairs.

Conservation status
This species might be possibly extinct as it is only known by the holotype, an adult male, collected by Alexander Morton from the Australian Museum during the HMS Cormorant expedition to the Solomon Islands in 1881. Surveys in 1987 and in 1991 failed to find any specimens and the Nggela Islands are badly deforestated.

References

Further reading

External links
Murid Rodents of the Solomon Islands Chain

Solomys
Extinct animals of Oceania
Endemic fauna of the Solomon Islands
Mammals of the Solomon Islands
Rodents of Oceania
Rodent extinctions since 1500
Taxonomy articles created by Polbot
Taxa named by Edward Pierson Ramsay